Pramod Kale (born 4 March 1941) is an Indian engineer who has worked for the Indian Space Research Organisation in various leadership roles.

Early life and education 
He was born on 4 March 1941 in Pune, India. Kale completed his matriculation in 1956 from the M.C. High School, Vadodara and went on to study at Fergusson College in Pune. He completed his BSc Physics from Maharaja Sayajirao University of Baroda in 1960 and then his MSc (Physics-Electronics) from Gujarat University, Ahmedabad in 1962.

Career 
While studying for his MSc he worked at the Physical Research Laboratory (PRL), Ahmedabad for getting practical experience of Electronics and Space Research. During that time he started work on Satellite tracking. After getting his MSc in 1962, he worked for three years as a research student of Vikram Sarabhai. In 1963 he was selected as a team member for the establishment of Thumba Equatorial Rocket Launching Station (TERLS), near Thiruvananthapuram and for that work was deputed to work at Goddard Space Flight Centre, NASA, USA.

Awards 
 Shri Hari Om Ashram Prerit Vikram Sarabhai Award for System Analysis and Management Problems, 1975
 Padma Shri, Government of India, 1984
 Shri R L Wadhawa Gold Medal of Institution of Electronics and Telecommunications Engineers 1991
 Bharat Jyoti Award presented by Front for National Progress 1999
 Aryabhatta Award, 2006 presented by the Astronautical Society of India in recognition of lifetime contribution to the promotion of astronautics.
Kale received the 2006 Aryabhatta award for his lifetime contribution to the promotion of astronomy in India.

Publications 
Kale has published over twenty-five papers on various subjects from 1964 until 1994.

References

1941 births
Indian Space Research Organisation people
Scientists from Maharashtra
Living people
Gujarat University alumni
Recipients of the Padma Shri in science & engineering
Maharaja Sayajirao University of Baroda alumni